The Consolidated OA-6 was a twin-engined observation amphibious aircraft proposed by Consolidated Aircraft in 1936.  The project was canceled before any aircraft were built.

References 

OA-6
1930s United States military reconnaissance aircraft
Amphibious aircraft
Twin-engined piston aircraft